Deccan can refer to the Deccan Plateau, a peninsular plateau in South Asia, or the historical Deccan region.

Deccan may also refer to:

Places
 Deccan
 Deccan Gymkhana, a sports neighborhood in Pune, India
 East Deccan dry evergreen forests, forests in the Indian states of Andhra Pradesh and Tamil Nadu

Events
 Deccan Riots, peasant revolt against moneylenders in colonial India
 Deccan Famine of 1630–32, a in early-modern India where some 2,000,000 people died

Airlines
 Deccan (airline), India's first low-cost airline, based in Bangalore, India
 Deccan Charters, an airline based in Bangalore, India
 Simplifly Deccan, formerly Air Deccan, was the first Indian low-cost carrier, headquartered in Bangalore
 Deccan 360 also known as Deccan Cargo & Express Logistics, was a cargo airline based in Bangalore
 Deccan Airways, an airline based in Hyderabad before independence
 Deccan Lanka, a low-cost Sri Lankan airline based in Colombo

Organisations
 Deccan Mujahideen, an alleged terrorist group in India
 Deccan States Agency, an administrative unit in British India
 Deccan sultanates, Muslim kingdoms ruling southern India during 15th-17th centuries

Railways
 Deccan Odyssey, a train traveling from Mumbai to several locations in Maharashtra and Goa
 Deccan Queen, a daily train traveling between Mumbai and Pune

Newspapers
 Deccan Chronicle, an Indian English-language newspaper
 Deccan Herald, an Indian English-language newspaper
 The Deccan Times, defunct Indian newspaper

Other uses
 Deccan Traps, the remnants of one of the world's largest volcanic events
 Deccan white carp (Cirrhinus fulungee), a species of freshwater cyprinid fish

See also
 Deccan College (disambiguation)
 Deccan Park (disambiguation)
 Deccani (disambiguation)
 Decan (disambiguation)